Wiley College is a private historically black college in Marshall, Texas. Founded in 1873 by the Methodist Episcopal Church's Bishop Isaac Wiley and certified in 1882 by the Freedman's Aid Society, it is one of the oldest predominantly black colleges west of the Mississippi River.

In 2005–2006, on-campus enrollment approached 450, while an off-campus program in Shreveport, Louisiana, for students with some prior college credits who seek to finish a degree, enrolled about 250. By fall of 2006, total enrollment was about 750. By fall of 2013, total enrollment reached over 1,000. Wiley is an open admissions college and about 96% of students receive some financial aid.

Over a 15-year period, Melvin B. Tolson's debate teams lost only one of 75 debates. Wiley's debate team competed against historically black colleges and earned national attention with its 1935 debate against University of Southern California's highly ranked debate team.

Academics
Wiley College offers bachelor's degrees through four academic divisions.

School of Business and Social Sciences
School of Education and Sciences

Civil Rights Movement
Wiley, along with Bishop College, was instrumental in the Civil Rights Movement in Texas. Wiley and Bishop students launched the first sit-ins in Texas in the rotunda of the Old Harrison County Courthouse to protest segregation in public facilities.

James Farmer, son of James L. Farmer, Sr., graduated from Wiley and became one of the "Big Four" of the Civil Rights Movement. Together with Roy Wilkins,  Rev. Dr. Martin Luther King Jr., and Whitney M. Young Jr.,  James Farmer helped organize the first sit-ins and Freedom Rides in the United States.

Debate team
Tony Scherman's article about the Wiley College debate team for the 1997 Spring issue of American Legacy sparked a renewed interest in its history.<ref>{{Cite web |url=http://www.blacknews.com/pr/americanlegacy701.html |title=BlackNews.com – American Legacy Magazine'''s Story: The Great Debaters, Turns from Pages to the Big Screen Directed By and Starring Denzel Washington and Produced By Oprah Winfrey |access-date=2009-04-29 |archive-date=2008-06-30 |archive-url=https://web.archive.org/web/20080630181528/http://www.blacknews.com/pr/americanlegacy701.html |url-status=dead }}</ref> The success of the 1935 Wiley College debate team, coached by professor and poet Melvin Tolson, was the subject of a 2005 AMS Pictures documentary, The Great Debaters, The Real Great Debaters of Wiley College, which received heavy play around Texas, followed by the 2007 dramatic movie, The Great Debaters, directed by and starring Denzel Washington. In 1935, the Wiley College debate team defeated the reigning national debate champion, the University of Southern California (depicted as Harvard University in The Great Debaters).

In 2007, Denzel Washington announced a donation of $1 million to Wiley so the team could be re-established.Wiley College – A Place Where Every Student Can Succeed, Dallas News The following year, The Great Debaters'' movie debuted, starring Washington; the college's debate team has taken this name, too.

In 2014, the 23-person team won 1st place at the Pi Kappa Delta Comprehensive National Tournament. This was the largest Pi Kappa Delta Tournament in their 101-year history. This was the first national speech and debate title won by an HBCU. Three years later, the college led the establishment of the first HBCU National Speech and Debate League. In 2018, Wiley hosted the first HBCU National Speech and Debate League Tournament.

Athletics
The Wiley athletic teams are called the Wildcats. The college is a member of the National Association of Intercollegiate Athletics (NAIA), primarily competing in the Gulf Coast Athletic Conference (GCAC) since the 2022–23 academic year. The Wildcats previously competed in the Red River Athletic Conference (RRAC) from 1998–99 to 2021–22. They were also a founding member of the Southwestern Athletic Conference (SWAC) from 1920–21 to 1967–68, which is currently an NCAA Division I FCS athletic conference.

Wiley competes in ten intercollegiate varsity sports: Men's sports include baseball, basketball, cross country, soccer and track & field. Women's sports include basketball, cross country, soccer, track & field and volleyball. Wiley the Wildcat is the mascot. Former sports included cheerleading.

On January 20, 2022, Wiley received an invitation to join the GCAC, along with Oakwood University (from the United States Collegiate Athletic Association (USCAA)) and the return of Southern University at New Orleans (SUNO), effective beginning in July 2022. The GCAC is an athletic conference affiliated with the NAIA.

Gallery

Notable people

Notable faculty

Notable alumni

References

External links 

 
 
 Official athletics website

 
Historically black universities and colleges in the United States
Red River Athletic Conference
Universities and colleges accredited by the Southern Association of Colleges and Schools
Private universities and colleges in Texas
Buildings and structures in Harrison County, Texas
Education in Harrison County, Texas
1873 establishments in Texas
Educational institutions established in 1873
Universities and colleges affiliated with the Methodist Episcopal Church
Historically black universities and colleges in Texas